This is a list of artists who create contemporary art, i.e., those whose peak of activity can be situated somewhere between the 1970s (the advent of postmodernism) and the present day. Artists on this list meet the following criteria:
The person is regarded as an important figure or is widely cited by his/her peers or successors.
The person is known for originating a significant new concept, theory or technique.
The person has created, or played a major role in co-creating, a significant or well-known work, or collective body of work, that has been the subject of an independent book or feature-length film, or of multiple independent periodical articles or reviews.
The person's work either (a) has become a significant monument, (b) has been a substantial part of a significant exhibition, (c) has won significant critical attention, or (d) is represented within the permanent collections of several notable galleries or museums, or had works in many significant libraries.

A
 Marina Abramović (born 1946), performance artist
 Vito Acconci (1940–2017), installation and performance artist
 Rita Ackermann (born 1968), artist
 Bas Jan Ader (1942–1979), conceptual artist
 Eija-Liisa Ahtila (born 1959), video artist
 Peggy Ahwesh (born 1954), video artist
 Chantal Akerman (1950–2015), filmmaker
 Vikky Alexander (born 1959), installation artist
 Edward Allington (1951–2017) sculptor
 Francis Alÿs (born 1959), conceptual artist
 El Anatsui (born 1944), sculptor and installation artist
 Laurie Anderson (born 1947), performance artist
 Carl Andre (born 1935), sculptor
 Janine Antoni (born 1964), sculptor and installation artist
 Ida Applebroog (born 1929), painter
 Nobuyoshi Araki (born 1940), photographer
 Diane Arbus (1923–1971), photographer
 Siah Armajani (1939–2020), sculptor
 Arman (1928–2005), sculptor
 John Armleder (born 1948), performance artist, painter, sculptor, critic, and curator
 Art & Language, conceptual artist
 Richard Artschwager (1923–2013), sculptor and painter
 Roy Ascott (born 1934), new media artist 
 Frank Auerbach (born 1931), painter
 Sofia Areal (born 1960), painter

B
 Francis Bacon (1909–1992), painter
 Jo Baer (born 1929), painter
 John Baldessari (1931–2020), conceptual artist
 Balthus (1908–2001), painter
 Banksy (born 1974), graffiti artist
 Fiona Banner (born 1966)
 Matthew Barney (born 1967), filmmaker
 Will Barnet (1911–2012), painter
 Artur Barrio (born 1945), interactive artist
 Jennifer Bartlett (born 1945), painter
 Georg Baselitz (born 1938), painter
 Jean-Michel Basquiat (1960–1988), painter
 Noah Becker (born 1970), painter
 Vanessa Beecroft (born 1969)
 Larry Bell (born 1939), sculptor
 Maurice Benayoun (born 1957), media artist
 Lynda Benglis (born 1941), sculptor
 Danelle Bergstrom (born 1957), painter
 José Bernal (1925–2010), painter/sculptor
 Joseph Beuys (1921–1986), sculptor, performance artist, installation artist
 Ashley Bickerton  (born 1959), mixed-media artist
 Janet Biggs  (born 1959), video and performance artist
 Dara Birnbaum (born 1946), video and installation artist
 Ronald Bladen, (1918–1988), sculptor 
 David Blatherwick (born 1960), painter and video artist
 Guy Bleus (born 1950), performance artist, mail art
 Christian Boltanski (1944–2021), sculptor, photographer, painter and film maker
 Alighiero Boëtti (1940–1994), conceptual artist 
 Maurizio Bolognini (born 1952), post-conceptual media artist
 Henry Bond (born 1966), writer, photographer and visual artist
 Christine Borland (born 1965)
 Michaël Borremans (born 1963), painter
 Eberhard Bosslet (born 1953), sculptor, installation artist
 Fernando Botero (born 1932), painter
Jack Boul (born 1927), painter, printmaker and sculptor
 Louise Bourgeois (1911–2010), sculptor and installation artist
 Mark Bradford (born 1961), painter
 Robert J Brawley (1937–2006), painter
 Candice Breitz (born 1972), video artist
 Stuart Brisley (born 1933), performance artist
 Marcel Broodthaers (1924–1976), poet, filmmaker and artist
 Glenn Brown (born 1966)
 Tania Bruguera (born 1968), installation and performance artist
 Angela Bulloch (born 1966), installation artist
 Deborah Butterfield (born 1949), sculptor
 Chris Burden (1946–2015), performance artist, sculptor, installation artist
 Jack Bush (1909–1977), painter
 Gerard Byrne (born 1969), installation artist

C
 Sophie Calle (born 1953), conceptual artist from France
 Nuno de Campos (born 1969), painter
 Janet Cardiff (born 1957), installation artist
 Gerard Caris (born 1925), sculptor
 Norman Carlberg (1928–2018), sculptor
 Gillian Carnegie (born 1971), painter
 Anthony Caro (1924–2013), sculptor
 Antonio Caro (1950–2021), painter, conceptualization
 Nicolas Carone (1917–2010), painter, sculptor
 James Casebere (born 1953), photographer
 Maurizio Cattelan (born 1960)
 Nick Cave (born 1959), performance artist, sculptor
 John Cederquist (born 1946), American sculptor
 Vija Celmins (born 1938), painter
 Saint Clair Cemin (born 1951) Brazilian sculptor
 John Chamberlain (1927–2011), sculptor
 Suki Chan (born 1977), video and installation artist
 Gordon Cheung, (born 1975), contemporary artist
 Jake and Dinos Chapman (born 1966 and 1962)
 Judy Chicago (born 1939), feminist artist
 Dale Chihuly (born 1941), glass artist
 Luke Ching (born 1972) conceptual artist 
 Dan Christensen (1942–2007), abstract painter
 Abraham David Christian (born 1952)
 Chinwe Chukwuogo-Roy (1952–2012), portrait painter and printmaker
 Christo and Jeanne-Claude (1935–2009)
 Paolo Cirio (born 1979), Internet artist
 Lygia Clark (1920–1988), painter, installation artist
 Brian Clarke (born 1953), multidisciplinary architectural artist, painter, stained glass designer
 Francesco Clemente (born 1952), painter
 Chuck Close (1940–2021), painter
 Claude Closky (born 1963)
 Arnaud Cohen (born 1968)
 Robert Colescott (1925–2009), painter
 Mat Collishaw (born 1966), photographer, video artist
 George Condo (born 1957), painter
 Cortis & Sonderegger (born 1978 and 1980), installation 
 Tony Cragg (born 1945), sculptor
 Michael Craig-Martin (born 1941), painter, printmaker, digital artist, sculpture
 Martin Creed (born 1968), installation artist
 Patricia Cronin (born 1963), cross-disciplinary artist
 José Luis Cuevas (1934–2017), painter, printmaker, sculptor

D
 Dado (1933–2010), painter
 Hanne Darboven (1941–2009), conceptual artist
 Ian Davenport (born 1966), painter and printmaker
 Ronald Davis (born 1937), abstract painter
 Richard Deacon (born 1949), sculptor
 Tacita Dean (born 1965), conceptual artist, filmmaker
 Wim Delvoye (born 1965), neo-conceptual artist
 Walter De Maria (1940–2013), installation artist, conceptual artist
 Abigail DeVille (born 1981), installation and sculpture artist
 Guy Denning (born 1965), painter
 Richard Diebenkorn (1922–1993), painter
 Rineke Dijkstra (born 1959), photographer
 Sam Dillemans (born 1965), painter
 DOT DOT DOT (artist) visual, public, conceptual artist
 Braco Dimitrijevic (born 1948)
 Jim Dine (born 1935), sculptor
 Mark di Suvero (born 1933), sculptor
 Harry Dodge (born 1966), visual artist 
 Peter Doig (born 1959), painter
 Marlene Dumas (born 1953), painter
 John Duncan (born 1953), performance, installation artist

E
 Martin Eder (born 1968), painter
 Ólafur Elíasson (born 1967)
 Tracey Emin (born 1963)
 Ben Enwonwu (1917–1994), painter and sculptor
 Bracha Ettinger (born 1948)
 Valie Export (born 1940)
Mary Beth Edelson (1933–2021) feminist artist

F
 Jan Fabre (born 1958), multidisciplinary artist
 Öjvind Fahlström (1928–1976), multimedia artist
 Harun Farocki (1944–2014), filmmaker
 Angus Fairhurst (1966–2008), installation artist
 Hans-Peter Feldmann (born 1941), photographer, installation artist
 Kenneth Feingold (born 1952), conceptual artist
 Brendan Fernandes (born 1979), performance artist
 Teresita Fernández (born 1968), multidisciplinary artist
 Esther Ferrer (born 1937),  conceptual and performance artist
 Carole Feuerman (born 1945), sculptor
 Stephen Finer (born 1949), painter
 Eric Fischl painter (born 1948), painter, sculptor and printmaker
 Peter Fischli & David Weiss (born 1952, 1946–2012)
 Dan Flavin (1933–1996)
 Bruno Fonseca (1958–1994), painter, sculptor
 Caio Fonseca (born 1959), painter
 Peter Forakis (1927–2009), sculptor
 Günther Förg (1952–2013), painter, graphic designer, sculptor and photographer
 Sam Francis (1923–1994), painter
 Helen Frankenthaler (1928–2011), painter
 Andrea Fraser (born 1965), performance artist
 Lucian Freud (1922–2011), painter
 Tom Friedman (born 1965), conceptual sculptor

G
 Ellen Gallagher (born 1965), multidisciplinary artist 

 Anya Gallaccio (born 1963), installation artist
 Enrico Garff (born 1939), painter
Kendell Geers (born May 1968) conceptual artist
 Isa Genzken (born 1948), sculptor
 Gilbert and George, (born 1943 and 1942), sculptors, performance artists
 Adrian Ghenie (born 1977), painter
 Sam Gilliam (born 1933), painter
 Liam Gillick (born 1964), conceptual artist
 Karin Giusti (born 1955), sculptor, installation artist
 Robert Gober (born 1954), sculptor
 Michael Goldberg (1924–2007), painter
 Nan Goldin (born 1953), photographer
 Jack Goldstein (1945–2003), painter
 Andy Goldsworthy (born 1956),  sculptor, photographer
 Peter Golfinopoulos (born 1928), painter
 Leon Golub (1922–2004), painter
 Felix Gonzales-Torres (1957–1996), sculptor, installation artist
 Dominique Gonzalez-Foerster (born 1965), artist and filmmaker
 Robert Goodnough (1917–2010), painter
 Douglas Gordon (born 1966), video art, photography
 Antony Gormley (born 1950), sculptor
 Dan Graham (1942-2022), multidisciplinary artist
 Robert Graham (1938–2008), sculptor
 Rodney Graham (born 1949), photographer, installation artist
 Cleve Gray (1918–2004), painter
 Kaloust Guedel (born 1956), painter, sculptor
 Genco Gulan (born 1969), sculptor, performance artist
 Don Gummer (born 1946), sculptor
 Andreas Gursky (born 1955), photographer

H
 Hans Haacke (born 1936), conceptual artist
 Jacques Halbert (born 1955), neo-dada artist
 Petrit Halilaj (born 1986)
 David Hall (1937–2014), video artist
 Richard Hamilton (1922–2011), painter, collagist
 Keith Haring (1958–1990), painter, graffiti artist
 Mona Hatoum (born 1952), performance artist
 Susan Hauptman (1947–2015), graphic fine artist 
 Carl Michael von Hausswolff (born 1956), sound artist 
 Tim Hawkinson (born 1960), sculpture artist
 Al Held (1928–2005), painter
 Gottfried Helnwein (born 1948), multimedia artist, installation artist, painter, photographer, performance artist
 Diango Hernandez (born 1970), conceptual artist, painter
 Jeremy Henderson (1952–2009), artist and painter 
 Eva Hesse (1936–1970), sculptor
 Andreas Heusser (born 1976), conceptual artist
 Hugo Heyrman (born 1942), painter, multimedia artist
 Gary Hill (born 1951), video artist
 Susan Hiller (1940–2019), installation artist
 Charles Hinman (born 1932), painter
 Thomas Hirschhorn (born 1957), installation artist
 Damien Hirst (born 1965), installation artist
 David Hockney  (born 1937), painter
 Jim Hodges (born 1957), installation artist
 Howard Hodgkin (1932–2017), painter
 Candida Höfer (born 1944), photographer 
 Tom Holland (born 1936), mixed media artist, painter
 Frank Holliday (born 1957)
 Saskia Holmkvist (born 1971), conceptual artist
 Christian Holstad (born 1972), conceptual artist
 Jenny Holzer (born 1950), interdisciplinary artist
 Roni Horn (born 1955), sculptor, installation artist and writer
 Peter Howson (born 1958), painter
 Teresa Hubbard/Alexander Birchler (born 1965/1962), video artists
 Gary Hume (born 1962), painter
 Philipp Humm (born 1959), painter, multi-disciplinary artist
 Pierre Huyghe (born 1962), media artist

I
 Jörg Immendorff (1945–2007), painter
 INO, visual artist

J
 Alfredo Jaar (born 1956), conceptual artist
 Richard Jackson (born 1939), painter, installation
Renata Jaworska (born 1979), painter
 Chantal Joffe (born 1969), painter
 Jasper Johns (born 1930), painter, printmaker
 Ray Johnson (1927–1995), pop artist, mail art
 Jennie C. Jones (born 1968), multidisciplinary
 Josignacio (born 1963), painter
 Donald Judd (1928–1994), sculptor
 Isaac Julien (born 1960), filmmaker

K

 Ilya Kabakov (born 1933), installation artist
 Eduardo Kac (born 1962), transgenic artist
 Stanya Kahn (born 1968), performance, video artist
 Wolf Kahn (1927–2020), landscapes, oil paints/pastels
 Anish Kapoor (born 1954), sculptor
 Allan Kaprow (1927–2006), painter, performance artist
 Deborah Kass (born 1952), mixed media artist
 On Kawara (1932–2014), conceptual artist
 Mary Kelly (born 1941), conceptual artist
 Mike Kelley (1954–2012), sculptor, installation artist, performance artist
 Ellsworth Kelly (1923–2015), painter
 William Kentridge (born 1955), draughtsman, film maker and sculptor
 Anselm Kiefer (born 1945), painter
 Manfred Kielnhofer (born 1967), sculptor, designer, photographer
 Edward Kienholz (1927–1994), installation artist
 Karen Kilimnik (born 1962), painter
 Bodys Isek Kingelez (1948–2015), sculpture
 Martin Kippenberger (1953–1997), conceptual artist, installation artist
 Komar and Melamid (born 1943 and 1945), conceptual artist
 Jeff Koons (born 1955), conceptual artist
 Mark Kostabi (born 1960), painter
 Barbara Kruger (born 1945), artist and photographer
 Alfred Freddy Krupa (born 1971), painter, book artist
 Peter Kuckei (born 1938), painter
 Yayoi Kusama (born 1929), installation artist, performance artist, painter

L
 David LaChapelle (born 1963), photographer
 Suzanne Lacy (born 1945), performance/public artist
 Ronnie Landfield (born 1947), painter
 Michael Landy (born 1963), conceptual artist
 Thomas Lanigan-Schmidt (born 1948), installation, collage
 Maria Lassnig (1919–2014), painter
 Matthieu Laurette (born 1970), multimedia, conceptual, installation, video artist
 Robert Lazzarini (born 1965), sculptor, installation artist
 Lee Bul (born 1964), sculpture, installation, conceptual artist
 Marc Lee (born 1969), installation, new media and conceptual artist
 Zoe Leonard (born 1961), photographer and visual artist
 Mark Lewis (born 1958), installation and film artist
 Sol LeWitt (1928–2007), installation and conceptual artist
 Richard Long (born 1945), sculptor, photographer, painter
 Robert Longo (born 1953), painter and sculptor
 Lee Lozano (1930–1999), painter
 Rafael Lozano-Hemmer (born 1967), installation artist
 Sarah Lucas (born 1962), photographer, sculptor, conceptual artist

M
 Robert Mangold (born 1937), painter
 Robert Mapplethorpe (1946–1989), photographer
 Christian Marclay (born 1955), composer, conceptual artist
Bruce McLean (born 1944) conceptual, performance, sculptor, painter 
 Brice Marden (born 1938), painter
 Kerry James Marshall (born 1955), painter
 Milovan Destil Marković (born 1957), painter, performance artist
 Agnes Martin (1912–2004), painter
 Eugene J. Martin (1938–2005), painter
 Enrique Martinez Celaya (1964), painter, sculptor
 Gordon Matta-Clark (1943–1978), conceptual artist
 Amanda Matthews (born 1968), sculptor, painter, public art designer
 Paul McCarthy (born 1945), performance and installation artist
 Allan McCollum (born 1944), sculptor, installation artist
 Ryan McGinley (born 1977), photographer
 Steve McQueen (born 1969), filmmaker
 Cildo Meireles (born 1948), sculptor and installation artist
 Ana Mendieta (1948–1985), sculptor, performance and video artist
 Yucef Merhi (born 1977), installation and new media artist
 Thom Merrick (born 1963), sculptor, painter
 Boris Mikhailov (born 1938), photographer
 Ann Mikolowski (1940–1999), portrait miniaturist, waterscape painter, printmaker, book artist
 Haroon Mirza (born 1977), sculptor, installation artist
 Eva Moll (born 1961), painter, performance and installation artist
Dianna Molzan (born 1972), painter, sculptor
 Franco Mondini-Ruiz (born 1961), painter, sculptor, performance and installation artist
 Jonathan Monk (born 1969), conceptual artist
 Sebastian Diaz Morales (born 1975), video artist
 François Morellet (1926–2016), painter, engraver, sculptor and light artist
 Yasumasa Morimura (born 1951), photographer
 Robert Morris (1931–2018), sculptor, writer and conceptual artist
 Ed Moses (1926–2018), painter
 Antoni Muntadas (born 1942), installation and new media artist
 Vik Muniz (born 1961), photographer
 Bruce Munro, installation artist
 Takashi Murakami (born 1962), sculptor and painter
 Elizabeth Murray (1940–2007), painter
 Zoran Mušič (1909–2005), painter
 Wangechi Mutu (born 1972), painter

N
 Bruce Nauman (born 1941)
 Ernesto Neto (born 1964), installation artist
John Nieto (1936–2018), painter
 Odd Nerdrum (born 1944), painter
 Shirin Neshat (born 1957), visual artist
 NEVERCREW (born 1980 and 1979), urban artists, installation artists
 Alexander Ney (born 1939), sculptor and painter
 Graham Nicholls (born 1975), installation artist
 Olaf Nicolai (born 1962), conceptual artist
 Kenneth Noland (1924–2010), painter
 Thomas Nozkowski (1944–2019), painter
 Jim Nutt (born 1938), painter
Marina Núñez (born 1966), multimedia artist

O
 Albert Oehlen (born 1954), painter
 Markus Oehlen (born 1956), painter
 Chris Ofili (born 1968), painter
 Georgia O'Keeffe (1887-1986), painter
 Claes Oldenburg (1929-2022), sculptor
 Jules Olitski (1922–2007), painter
 Nathan Oliveira (1928–2010), painter
 Yoko Ono (born 1933), musician, artist
 Bruce Onobrakpeya (born 1932), printmaker, painter and sculptor 
 Orlan (born 1947), performance and body artist
 Roman Opałka (1931–2011), painter
Catherine Opie (born 1961), photographer
 Julian Opie (born 1958), digital artist
 Dennis Oppenheim (1938–2011), conceptual and installation artist
 Gabriel Orozco (born 1962), conceptual and installation artist
 Tony Oursler (born 1957), multimedia and installation artist

P
 Nam June Paik (1932–2006), video artist
 Roxy Paine (born 1966), sculptor
 Eduardo Paolozzi (1924–2005), sculptor
 Niki de Saint Phalle (1930–2002), sculptor
 Cornelia Parker (born 1956), sculptor and installation artist
 Ray Parker (1922–1990), painter
 Ed Paschke (1939–2004), painter
 Simon Patterson (born 1967), conceptual artist
 Oliver Payne and Nick Relph (born 1977 and 1979), video artists
 Grayson Perry (born 1960), ceramicist
 Raymond Pettibon (born 1957), drawing, video and installation artist
 Elizabeth Peyton (born 1965), painter
 Adrian Piper (born 1948), conceptual artist
 Steven Pippin (born 1960), sculptor
 Michelangelo Pistoletto (born 1933), painter, action and object artist
Lari Pittman (born 1952), painter
 Paola Pivi (born 1971), multimedia artist
 Sigmar Polke (1941–2010), painter, photographer
 Larry Poons (born 1937), painter
 William Powhida (born 1976), drawing, painter, writer
 Kenneth Price (1935–2012), ceramicist, sculptor
 Richard Prince (born 1949), painter and photographer
 Laure Prouvost (born 1978), installation artist, 2013 Turner Prize winner
 Martin Puryear (born 1941), sculptor

Q
 Marc Quinn (born 1964), sculptor

R
 Alessandro Raho (born 1971), painter and photographer
 Arnulf Rainer (born 1929), painter
 Yvonne Rainer (born 1934), performance artist
 Rallé (born 1949), painter
 Chitra Ramanathan (born 1955), painter, art educator
 Paul Henry Ramirez (born 1963), painter
 Neo Rauch (born 1960), painter
 Robert Rauschenberg (1925–2008), painter, collagist, printmaker, neo-dadaist
 Peter Reginato (born 1945), sculptor
 Paula Rego (born 1935), painter
 Seund Ja Rhee (1918–2009), painter, printmaker, and ceramicist
 Jason Rhoades (1965–2006), installation artist and sculptor
 Jesse Richards (born 1975), artist
 Gerhard Richter (born 1932), painter
 Pipilotti Rist (born 1962), video artist
 Larry Rivers  (1923–2002), painter, multi-media 
 James Rosenquist (1933–2017), painter
 Martha Rosler (born 1943), video artist, installation artist and performance artist
 Dieter Roth (1930–1998), artist's books, sculptor, installation artist
 Thomas Ruff (born 1958), photographer
 Allen Ruppersberg (born 1944), conceptualist, mixed media, installation artist
 Edward Ruscha (born 1937), painter, printmaker and filmmaker

S
 Anri Sala (born 1974), video artist
 Chéri Samba (born 1956), painter
 Jean-Michel Sanejouand (1934–2021), painter and sculptor
 David Salle (born 1952), painter
 Bojan Sarcevic (born 1974), sculptor
 Wilhelm Sasnal (born 1972), painter
 Jenny Saville (born 1970), painter
 Raymond Saunders (born 1934), painter
 Markus Schinwald (born 1973), painter, sculptor and filmmaker
 Julian Schnabel (born 1951), painter, sculptor and filmmaker
 Carolee Schneemann (1939-2019), performance artist
 Thomas Schütte (born 1954), sculptor
 Richard Serra (born 1939), sculptor
 Joel Shapiro (born 1941), sculptor
 Sonia Landy Sheridan (1925–2021), art researcher
 Cindy Sherman (born 1954), photographer, performance artist
 Yinka Shonibare (born 1962)
 Amy Sillman (born 1966), painter
 David Simpson, (born 1928), painter
 Lorna Simpson (born 1960), interdisciplinary artist
 Bob and Roberta Smith (born 1958)
 Jack Smith (1932–1989), film director
 Kiki Smith (born 1954), feminist artist
 Robert Smithson (1938–1973), land artist, sculptor and photographer
 Michael Snow (born 1929), filmmaker, musician, painter
 Joan Snyder (born 1940), painter
 Keith Sonnier (1941–2020), sculptor
 Pierre Soulages (1919–2022), painter
 Nancy Spero (1926–2009), painter
 Joe Stefanelli (1921–2017), painter
 Pat Steir (born 1940), painter
 Frank Stella (born 1936), painter, printmaker
 Thomas Struth (born 1954), photographer 
 Hiroshi Sugimoto (born 1948), photographer
 Sarah Sze (born 1969), sculptor

T
 William Tillyer (born 1938), painter, printmaker, watercolorist
Tomoko Takahashi (born 1966), installation artist
 Mark Tansey (born 1949), painter
 Sam Taylor-Wood (born 1967), filmmaker, photographer
 Diana Thater (born 1962), video artist
 Paul Thek (1933–1988), painter, sculptor, installation artist
 Wayne Thiebaud (1920-2021), painter, printmaker
 Hank Willis Thomas (born 1976), conceptual artist
 Arthur Thrall (1926–2015), printmaker, painter
 Agnes Thurnauer (born 1962)
 Wolfgang Tillmans (born 1968), photographer
 Rirkrit Tiravanija (born 1961), conceptual and installation artist
 Mark Titchner (born 1973), painter
 Slaven Tolj (born 1964), performance, installation artist
 Seb Toussaint (born 1988), painter, street art, murals
 Scott Treleaven (born 1975), filmmaker
 Rosemarie Trockel (born 1952), installation artist
 Gavin Turk (born 1967), sculptor
 James Turrell (born 1943), installation artist
 Richard Tuttle (born 1941), postminimalist
 Luc Tuymans (born 1958), painter
 Cy Twombly (1928–2011), painter
 Keith Tyson (born 1969), drawing, painter, installation artist

U
 Francis Upritchard (born 1976), installation artist
Tomasz Urbanowicz (born 1959), architectural glass artist

V
 Koen Vanmechelen (born 1965), multimedia artist, social art
 Lydia Venieri (born 1964), painter, sculptor, photographer
 Bill Viola (born 1951), video artist
 Wolf Vostell (1932–1998), multimedia artist
 Peter Voulkos (1924–2002), ceramicist, sculptor
Marc Vaux (born 1932), conceptual, painter, sculptor

W
 Kara Walker (born 1969), installation artist 
 Jeff Wall (born 1946), photographer
 Magnus Wallin (born 1965), video artist
 Mark Wallinger (born 1959), conceptual artist
 Suling Wang (born 1968), painter
 Andy Warhol (1928–1987), pop artist
 Gillian Wearing (born 1963), conceptual artist
 Carrie Mae Weems (born 1953), photographer 
 Lawrence Weiner (1942–2021), conceptual artist
 Monika Weiss (born 1964), installation, video and performance artist
 Ai Weiwei (born 1957), Chinese, conceptual artist
 Tom Wesselmann (1931–2004), painter
 Franz West (1947–2012), drawing, painter, sculptor
 Rachel Whiteread (born 1963), sculptor
 Jack Whitten (1939–2018), painter
 Alison Wilding (born 1948), sculptor
 Hannah Wilke (1940–1993), sculptor
 Thornton Willis (born 1936), painter
 Jane and Louise Wilson (born 1967), installation artists
 Richard Wilson (born 1953), installation artist
 Joel-Peter Witkin (born 1939), photographer
 Francesca Woodman (1958–1981), photographer
 Wu Guanzhong (1919–2010), painter
 Erwin Wurm (born 1954), sculptor, photographer
 Andrew Wyeth (1917–2009), painter

X
Xing Xin (born 1981), performance artist

Y
Lynette Yiadom-Boakye (born 1977), painter
Peter Young (born 1940), painter
Jack Youngerman (1926–2020), painter

Z
Andrea Zittel (born 1965), installation artist
Larry Zox (1936–2006), painter
Ricardo Estanislao Zulueta (born 1962), interdisciplinary artist

See also
Art
Lists of painters
List of modern artists
List of sculptors

Notes

References

Contemporary artists
Contemporary artists